The Romualdo Formation is a geologic Konservat-Lagerstätte in northeastern Brazil's Araripe Basin where the states of Pernambuco, Piauí and Ceará come together. The geological formation, previously designated as the Romualdo Member of the Santana Formation, named after the village of Santana do Cariri, lies at the base of the Araripe Plateau. It was discovered by Johann Baptist von Spix in 1819. The strata were deposited during the Aptian stage of the Early Cretaceous in a lacustrine rift basin with shallow marine incursions of the proto-Atlantic. At that time, the South Atlantic was opening up in a long narrow shallow sea.

The Romualdo Formation earns the designation of Lagerstätte due to an exceedingly well preserved and diverse fossil faunal assemblage. Some 25 species of fossil fishes are often found with stomach contents preserved, enabling paleontologists to study predator–prey relationships in this ecosystem. There are also fine examples of pterosaurs, reptiles and invertebrates, and crocodylomorphs. Even dinosaurs are represented (Spinosauridae, Tyrannosauroidea, Compsognathidae). The unusual taphonomy of the site resulted in limestone accretions that formed nodules around dead organisms, preserving even soft parts of their anatomy. In preservation, the nodules are etched away with acid, and the fossils often prepared by the transfer technique.

Local mining activities for cement and construction damage the sites. Trade in illegally collected fossils has sprung up from the decade of 1970, driven by the remarkable state of preservation and beauty of these fossils and amounting to a considerable local industry. An urgent preservation program is being called for by paleontologists.

In addition, the weathering of Romualdo Formation rocks has contributed soil conditions unlike elsewhere in the region. The Araripe manakin (Antilophia bokermanni) is a very rare bird that was discovered only in the late 20th century; it is not known from anywhere outside the characteristic forest that grows on the Chapada do Araripe soils formed ultimately from Romualdo Formation rocks.

Geology and dating 

The Crato Formation was previously considered the lowest member of the then Santana Formation, but has been elevated to a formal formation. The Crato Formation is the product of a single phase, where complicated sequence of sediment strata reflect changeable conditions in the opening sea. The age of the Romualdo Formation, formerly known as the Romualdo Member of the Santana Formation, has been controversial, though most workers have agreed that it lies on or near the Aptian-Albian boundary, about 112 million years ago. Nevertheless, a Cenomanian age cannot be ruled out.

The extent of the Crato unit and its relationship to the Romualdo Formation had long been ill-defined. It was not until a 2007 volume on the unit by Martill, Bechly and Loveridge that the Crato Formation was given a formal type locality, and was formally made a distinct formation separate from the Romualdo Formation, which is about 10 Ma younger.

Fossil content

Archosaurs 
Indeterminate remains of non-avian theropods, avialans, ornithischians, and possibly oviraptorosaurs have been found in Ceara state, Brazil. The oviraptorosaurian remains have been re-identified as megaraptoran fossils.

Dinosaurs

Crocodylomorphs

Pterosaurs

Turtles

Fish 

 Araripelepidotes
 Beurlenichthys ouricuriensis
 Brannerion
 Calamopleurus
 Cladocyclus
 Enneles audax
 Iemanja palma
 Lepidotes wenzai
 Microdon penalvai
 Notelops
 Obaichthys
 Oshunia brevis
 Placidichthys bidorsalis
 Rhacolepis
 Rhinobatos beurleni
 Santanaclupea silvasantosi
 Tharrhias
 Tribodus limae
 Vinctifer

See also 

 List of fossil sites (with link directory)
 List of dinosaur-bearing rock formations
 Araripe Basin
 Cerro Barcino Formation
 Elrhaz Formation
 Guarujá Formation
 Itapecuru Formation
 Mata Amarilla Formation

References

Bibliography

Further reading 
 David M. Martill, 1993. Fossils of the Santana and Crato Formations, Brazil (Field Guide to Fossils no. 5) (The Palaeontological Association) 
  
    
 

 
Geologic formations of Brazil
Cretaceous Brazil
Cretaceous paleontological sites of South America
Paleontology in Brazil
Mudstone formations
Deltaic deposits
Environment of Ceará
Environment of Pernambuco
Environment of Piauí
Landforms of Ceará
Landforms of Pernambuco
Landforms of Piauí
Northeast Region, Brazil